Cossulus lignosus is a moth in the family Cossidae. It is found in Turkey, Syria, Lebanon and Iran.

Subspecies
Cossulus lignosus lignosus (Syria, Lebanon, Iran)
Cossulus lignosus solgunus de Freina, 1983 (Turkey)

References

Natural History Museum Lepidoptera generic names catalog

Moths described in 1938
Cossinae
Moths of the Middle East